Hawthorne Books is an independent publisher founded in 2001 in Portland, Oregon, U.S., specializing in literary fiction and creative nonfiction original trade paperbacks.

Authors 
 Kristen Wiig has optioned the film rights for Monica Drake's Clown Girl.
 Lidia Yuknavitch, author of The Chronology of Water, won the 2012 PNBA Award and is shortlisted for the 2012 Oregon Book Award.
 Frank Meeink of Autobiography of a Recovering Skinhead was featured on WHYY's Fresh Air. 
 Hawthorne's title The Well and The Mine by Gin Phillips won her the 2008 Barnes & Noble Discover Award. Penguin Press bought the rights to The Well and The Mine shortly after. 
 Scott Nadelson won the Oregon Book Award and the Great Lakes Colleges Association Award for Saving Stanley in 2004.
 Hawthorne's rediscovery series celebrates American writers by bringing back to print titles by authors such as Richard Wiley, Lynne Sharon Schwartz, Tom Spanbauer and Toby Olson.
 Introductions to Hawthorne Books' writers are often written by esteemed authors including Wole Soyinka, Ursula Hegi, Chuck Palahniuk, A. M. Homes, Robert Coover, Fannie Flagg and Robin Givens.

See also
 List of companies based in Oregon

References

External links 
 

Small press publishing companies
Companies based in Portland, Oregon
Publishing companies established in 2001
Book publishing companies based in Oregon
Privately held companies based in Oregon
2001 establishments in Oregon